Khlyzino is a rural locality (a village) in Sidorovskoye Rural Settlement, Gryazovetsky District, Vologda Oblast, Russia. The population was 9 as of 2002.

Geography 
Khlyzino is located 34 km southeast of Gryazovets (the district's administrative centre) by road. Sloboda is the nearest rural locality.

References 

Rural localities in Gryazovetsky District